The NBA on USA is the de facto name for the USA Network's National Basketball Association (NBA) television coverage. The program ran from the  season through the  season.

Coverage overview

Before the USA Network came to be (1969-1979)

Manhattan Cable and HBO
Manhattan Cable (subsequently referred to as the MSG Network) debuted in the spring of 1969 and did all home events from the Madison Square Garden: New York Knicks basketball, New York Rangers hockey, college basketball, horse shows, Golden Gloves boxing, tennis, the Westminster Dog Show, ice capades, professional wrestling, etc.  The first reference to the channel as “MSG Network” was sometime around 1971–72, although the name did not become official until 1977. 
 
The first televised events were NHL and NBA playoffs in the spring of 1969; in those playoffs Marty Glickman did play-by-play for the Knicks broadcasts while Win Elliott did play-by-play for the Rangers.

Meanwhile, HBO began simulcasting some MSG games in 1972 beginning with the Rangers/Vancouver Canucks game on November 8, 1972 (the first ever program televised on HBO, to a few subscribers in Wilkes-Barre, PA).  1974–75 marked the only year in which HBO used MSG announcers for their feed.  Because HBO is a premium cable service, this created a burden on announcers to fill in dead airtime on HBO while commercials aired on MSG Network.  HBO did not broadcast Knicks or Rangers games after the 1976–77 season.

UA-Columbia
When the MSG/HBO marriage ended in 1977, Madison Square Garden proceeded to seek a new partner to launch a national network to show off its events.  So for several years, beginning with the 1977–78 season, all MSG home events (such as those involving the Knicks, Rangers, etc.) were then televised on a fledgling network that would eventually become known as the USA Network.  This channel, which debuted in September 1977, was basically a continuation of the existing MSG Network.  The key difference however, was that it was now nationally syndicated via satellite rather than terrestrially.  It was also the first cable channel to be supported by advertising revenues.  By this time, the channel was officially called the “Madison Square Garden Network” or MSG Network.

In , the National Hockey League replaced their syndicated coverage package The NHL Network with a package on USA.  At the time, the USA Network was called UA-Columbia.  As the immediate forerunner for the USA Network, UA-Columbia, served as the cable syndicated arm of MSG Network in New York, PRISM channel in Philadelphia, and whatever pay/cable outlets were around in 1979.

The formation of the USA Network
On April 9, 1980, the Madison Square Garden Network changed its name to the USA Network.  This occurred when the ownership structure was reorganized under a joint operating agreement by the UA-Columbia Cablevision cable system (now known as Cablevision Systems Corporation) and MCA (then the parent of Universal Studios, now owned by NBCUniversal).  Things took a step further one year later when, Time Inc. (which eventually merged with Warner Communications to form Time Warner) and Paramount Pictures Corp. (then a division of Gulf+Western, now owned by Viacom) took minority ownership stakes in USA in 1981. G+W also owned the New York Knicks and the MSG regional sports television network (both later owned by Cablevision, but spun off in 2010).

1981-84 coverage
When the USA Network signed a three-year (running through the 1981-82 season), $1.5 million deal, it marked the first time that the NBA had a cable television partner. USA would extend their deal with a two-year contract (along with another cable partner in the form of ESPN) worth a total of $11 million.

USA typically aired approximately 35-40 regular season doubleheaders on Thursday nights. Besides regular season and playoff action, USA also broadcast the NBA Draft. USA (as well as ESPN) was ultimately succeeded by TBS, who paid $20 million for two years beginning in the  season.

Announcers
Al Albert
Hubie Brown
Lou Carnesecca (an analyst for USA's draft coverage)
Eddie Doucette 
Steve Jones
Jim Karvellas 
Tom Kelly
Jon McGlocklin
Richie Powers

In 1980, USA televised two NBA games on Christmas Day. Jim Karvellas and Richie Powers called the early game involving New Jersey at Washington. Meanwhile, Eddie Doucette and Steve Jones called the late game involving Golden State at Portland.

During the 1981-82 season, Al Albert and Hubie Brown called the early game while Eddie Doucette and Steve "Snapper" Jones called the late game. Hubie Brown was subsequently replaced by Jon McGlocklin as Al Albert's partner.

The 1982 NBA Finals documentary "Something To Prove" recaps all the action of this series. It was the last NBA video documentary to exclusively use film in all on-court action. Dick Stockton narrated the documentary, with the condensed USA Network version narrated by Al Albert.

Conference Finals broadcasters

See also
NHL on USA
The USA Thursday Game of the Week
USA Tuesday Night Fights

References

External links
Old Time Radio Shows - PRO BASKETBALL

USA Network original programming
USA
1979 American television series debuts
1984 American television series endings
1970s American television series
1980s American television series
USA Network Sports